Make It Big Big is a 2019 Singaporean comedy film directed by Mark Lee in his feature directorial debut. The film stars Lee, Dennis Chew, Marcus Chin and Chen Biyu. The film was released on 3 January 2019 and revolves around the daily lives of the four radio presenters of Love 97.2FM "The Breakfast Quartet" show. The film also features cameo appearances by Singaporean and overseas entertainers and DJs from LOVE 97.2FM. It debuted in fourth place on the box office chart in Singapore.

Cast
 Mark Lee as himself
 Dennis Chew as himself
 Marcus Chin as himself
 Chen Biyu as herself

The film also featured many cameo appearances including Zoe Tay, Christopher Lee, Fann Wong, Chew Chor Meng, Jack Neo, Henry Thia, Guo Liang, You Yi, and Chapman To.

References

External links
 

2019 films
2019 comedy films
Singaporean comedy films
2010s Mandarin-language films